"Mashed Potato Time" is a 1962 single written by Kal Mann and Bernie Lowe, and performed by Dee Dee Sharp, with backing vocals by The Orlons, on her debut album It's Mashed Potato Time. The song refers to the Mashed Potato dance move, which was a fad. It was one of several songs that at that time that referenced the dance, another being James Brown's "Mashed Potatoes U.S.A." The Marvelettes song "Please Mr. Postman" is mentioned in the lyrics and is copied in the arrangement. Also mentioned in the lyrics are the songs "The Lion Sleeps Tonight" by the Tokens and "Dear Lady Twist" by Gary U.S. Bonds. Sharp recorded a sequel to "Mashed Potato Time" called "Gravy (For My Mashed Potatoes)".

In 1996 the Campbell Soup Company featured the song in a $30 million advertising campaign, using a new, more upbeat recording by Sharp.

In 2009, the song appeared in the video game Just Dance as a playable track.

In 2022, it appeared in a TV commercial for AirBNB.

Chart performance
The song reached No. 1 on the Cashbox Top 100 and Billboard R&B charts in 1962, as well as No. 2 on the Billboard Hot 100 chart. It was kept from the No. 1 spot by "Soldier Boy" by The Shirelles. Billboard ranked it as the No. 3 song for 1962.  It became a gold record.

Cover versions
Dick and Dee Dee released a version of the song on their 1962 album Tell Me - The Mountain's High. 
The Marvelettes, whose hit "Please Mr. Postman" was mentioned in the lyrics, covered this song on their 1962 album The Marvelettes Sing. 
Dee Dee Ramone, as Dee Dee King, recorded a hip hop version of the song, with new lyrics, on his 1989 album Standing in the Spotlight, with Debbie Harry on backing vocals.

Bobby "Boris" Pickett's "Monster Mash," released a few months after "Mashed Potato Time", was written in part as a parody of Dee Dee Sharp's record, even copying the "whaa-oo" backing vocal.

See also 
List of number-one R&B singles of 1962 (U.S.)

References 

1962 songs
1962 debut singles
Cashbox number-one singles
Dee Dee Sharp songs
Songs about dancing
Songs written by Bernie Lowe